An avant-corps ( or , plural ,), a French term literally meaning "fore-body", is a part of a building, such as a porch or pavilion, that juts out from the corps de logis, often taller than other parts of the building. It is common in façades in French Baroque architecture.

Particularly in German architecture, a corner Risalit is where two wings meet at right-angles.

Terms

By position to the building 
A central avant-corps stands in the middle of the facade.

A side projection is positioned off-centre.

Two wings (usually) running at right angles to each other flow into a corner avant-corps.

By function 
Entrance risalit in which the entrance is located.

Torrisalit, in which a gate or a gate passage is located.

Terms from the environment 
The reserve is the facade of the main alignment line of the building, which is receding compared to the front of the risalit. It is also known as Arrierecorps (Arrière-corps, French arrière corps: "behind the structure").

The frontispiece is the gable triangle above a central risalit.

Sources
Much of the text of this article comes from the equivalent German-language Wikipedia article retrieved on 18 March 2006.

Ornaments (architecture)